Archirhoe indefinata is a species of geometrid moth in the family Geometridae.

The MONA or Hodges number for Archirhoe indefinata is 7296.

References

Further reading

 
 

Hydriomenini
Articles created by Qbugbot
Moths described in 1907